The 1650s decade ran from January 1, 1650, to December 31, 1659.

Notes

References